Guanacaste National Park may refer to:
Guanacaste National Park (Belize)
Guanacaste National Park (Costa Rica)